
Laguna Pistola is a lake in the Santa Cruz Department, Bolivia. Its surface area is 33.52 km² and a shore length of 25.9 km.

Lakes of Santa Cruz Department (Bolivia)